Robert Raynbird (29 May 1851 – 26 December 1920) was an English first-class cricketer.

Raynbird made a single first-class appearance in 1878 for Hampshire against Kent. Raynbird was dismissed for ducks in both innings and bowled twelve balls, conceding fifteen runs.

Raynbird died in Basingstoke, Hampshire, on 26 December 1920.

Family
Raynbird's brother, Walter Raynbird represented Hampshire in a two first-class matches in the 1880 and 1881 seasons.

External links
Robert Raynbird at Cricinfo
Robert Raynbird at CricketArchive

1851 births
1920 deaths
People from Laverstoke
English cricketers
Hampshire cricketers
People from Basingstoke